Thaís de Souza Melchior Affonso (Rio de Janeiro, 2 November 1990) is a Brazilian actress.

Filmography

References

External links

Brazilian television actresses
20th-century Brazilian actresses
1990 births
Living people
21st-century Brazilian actresses
Brazilian female models
Actresses from Rio de Janeiro (city)